Triangle Sun is an international pop/electronic, downtempo, chillout band. It was created in 2004 by international musician and composer Alexander Knyazev. Based in Los Angeles.

The compositions of the project are included in the world music collections Café del Mar, Buddha Bar, Mykonos 2019 and more than two dozen collections. Triangle Sun songs are rotated in 53 countries.

History

In 2004 Triangle Sun began the ascension on a musical scene. Same year they have won the Russian festival Cafe Del Mar Lounge. Then went to Spanish coast of Ibiza to play in world famous Cafe Del Mar (Ibiza) and won there too. Soon the track Beautiful was licensed by Cafe Del Mar XIII, thanks to which Triangle Sun has become popular in Europe and America.

As a result, in summer 2005, Triangle Sun performed as headliner at festival Parliament Lounge.

Thus, Triangle Sun became a project included in the series of compilations Cafe del Mar, and then a project that performed at the festival Global Gathering 2007 in London.

The debut album of Triangle Sun under the name Diamond was released in September 2007 on Diamond Records.

In 2009 Alexander Knyazev have found their own musical label TSM.

In 2010 Mars licensed a track by Triangle Sun founder Alexander Knyazev, called "Moments" as a soundtrack for the TVC of chocolate Dove on the American market. 

Same year managers of German division Sony music have included their composition "Diamond" in 9th vol. of Erotic lounge, among such musical collectives as Air, Tosca, Thievery Corporation, Kruder and Dorfmeister, Jazzanova, Yonderboi, Blank&Jones, Groove Armada and many other well-known masters of international downtempo scene which figured throughout previous issues. The release took place in October 2010.

In 2011 French label, Wagram has included a composition "When you go forward" to the 13th volume of Buddha Bar compilation series.

Since 2011, Triangle Sun has been in MTV's global rotation. Also the project rotated on VH1 in Brazil, VIVA TV in Germany and Poland. 

In 2013, the project received the club's Golden Gargoyle award in the category "Best electronic project of the year". 

In 2015, the band members were invited to Sochi to perform in the cultural and entertainment part of the Formula 1 Russia Grand Prix.  

In 2016, Triangle Sun became a headliner at the largest fashion events of the year in Russia — "Vogue Fashion's Night Out 2016" and "SNC NET DAY 2016". 

In 2017, Triangle Sun headlined GQs "100 most stylish" and Maxim magazine's "100 sexiest women in Russia" event.

In 2018, the project became the headliner of ELLE magazine's event in Russia.

Members 
 Alexander Knyazev (founder of the project) — vocal, composer, programming. He was born in Moscow, 21 April 1984. Lives in Los Angeles. Permanent member of the jury of the Russian National Music Award. The author of the music of the main video of the opening ceremony of the Winter Olympic Games in 2014 in Sochi. Host on the radio Relax FM his author's program Relax Single. The author of the music of the world exhibition Expo 2017 in Astana. Composer of the opening ceremony of the historical stage of the Bolshoi theatre of Russia. In parallel writes music for television shows (TEFI, The King of the Ring) and commercials (Beeline, Dove, Philips, Panasonic, OBI, Samsung etc.).
 Pavel Kovan — drummer.

Discography

Studio albums

Compilations

Awards
 2013 — Golden Gargoyle — "Best electronic project of the year".

Festivals 

 2015 — Bosco Fresh Festival;
 2015 — Wake Weekend;
 2015 — VK Fest;
 2017 — Alfa Future People;
 2019 — Super MEGA Fest.

Soundtracks 
In 2006, a film Slide was released, directed by Anna Kelchevskaya, where the composition "Buddha" was chosen to be the main musical theme.

In 2012, song "When you go forward" has been licensed for the feature film Everything is simple directed by Sonia Karpunina.

In 2016, song "When you go forward" has been licensed for the feature film Box directed by Eduard Bordukov.

In 2018, the composition "Buddha" was licensed by a film Studio in Los Angeles, which released the film Ray Meets Helen and made this composition the soundtrack to the film.

Music videos
Triangle Sun shot 2 music videos on singles from both albums. In 2011 both albums entered a global MTV and now are on air in such regions as:

 ;
 ;
 ;
 ;
 ;
 ;
 ;
 ;
 ;
 ;
 ;
 ;
 ;
 .

Both of the videos are also being rotated on VH1 in Brazil, VIVA TV in Germany and Poland, A-One, Music Box, BRIDGE TV in Russia, M1 in Ukraine.

Videography 
Release: 15 January 2010
Beautiful

Director: Roman Jirnih
DOP:  Marat Adelshin
Producer: Anton Kirillov
Cut: Ivan Gaev 
Color grading Salamandra

Where will you go

Release: 19 September 2010

Director: Charley Stadler (DE)
DOP: Charley Stadler (DE)
Producer: Anton Kirillov
Cut: Cutting Edge (GB) 
Color grading: Scanwerk (DE)

Remixes 
Beautiful
 2007 — BarBQ;
 2010 — Wamdue project;
 2010 — Santerna

Label: SongBird, Netherlands.

Upside Down
 2014 — Betoko & Jose Maria Ramon;

Your little Clown

 2015 — Sasha Knyazev;

The Red Line

 2016 — Sasha Knyazev.

Rotations 
Triangle Sun tracks are rotated on more than 100 Russian and European radio stations, such as Radio Record, Relax FM, Radio Jazz, Silver Rain Radio, Radio Mayak, Radio Maximum, Hit FM, Ibiza Sonica (Spain), Klassik Radio (Germany), Lounge FM (Austria), Radionotte (Italy) and others.

References

External links

Triangle Sun on the Internet
 Official web site Triangle Sun
 Triangle Sun at Myspace
 Triangle Sun at Facebook
 Triangle Sun at Youtube
 Triangle Sun at Soundcloud
 Triangle Sun at Spotify

Press about Triangle Sun
 GQ: Fans put each new song on repeat
 Elle: Alexander Knyazev: "Music is the voice of the soul"
 Eclectic Magazine: Triangle Sun - World famous stars of electronic music
 Maxim Magazine: Alexander Knyazev: "My compositions are better known abroad, but in Russia they recognize me on the streets"
 TONSPION.de Digital release 

Russian electronic music groups
Russian pop music groups
Musical groups from Moscow
Musical groups established in 2004
2004 establishments in Russia